JP International School is a senior, secondary co-educational school located in Greater Noida in the Indian state of Uttar Pradesh. It is an English Medium School that follows the CBSE curriculum. The school was established in 2004 and is supported by the Sparsh Group. Board members include Padma Bhushan, Padma Shri Awardee and Dr. Shayama Chona.

Location

Curriculum

The school is affiliated to the Central Board of Secondary Education (CBSE). It follows the curriculum throughout the mentioned sections and classes:

Junior Section: Continuous and Comprehensive Evaluation(CCE) designed by CBSE
Middle Section (Classes VI-VIII): Curriculum based on CCE and guidelines laid out by NCERT and the Directorate of Education, New Delhi
Senior Section (IX-XII): Curriculum prescribed by CBSE

Campus
The school campus has an area of 8,130 square meters. The playground measures around 10,000 square meters. The overall built-up area is 10,220 square meters.

Academic life 

J.P. International School operates two six day weeks and two 5 day weeks, comprising 8 lectures per day. A typical school day includes eight classes with a 20-minute break. An academic year consists of two terms. Internal examinations provide regular  student assessments. These internal estimates are known as trials and eliminate massive academic pressure from the students. The educational curriculum instills confidence in the learners. The total number of teaching and the nonteaching staff is 230. The academic session usually starts from April and continues through March of the next year.

Physical infrastructure

The school includes 65 classrooms, out of which 55 are smart classes. It has a well-furnished library. It has a mathematics lab, a computer lab, a social science lab, technology laboratories, a robotics laboratory, digital language lab, 3D printing lab and a life skills lab. The school has sprinklers, fire extinguishers and fire alarms. Among other facilities are a swimming pool but is under some renovation from past 2 years, music rooms, skating rink, canteen, amphitheater, medical room with 1 trained PhD nurse and a seminar room which is capable of holding a total of 100 students a time.

Transport

The school has 50 buses to ferry students across the city. All the buses are GPS-enabled.

Scholar badge policy

Badges are awarded to students for their performance in academics. In order to earn a scholarship badge, students are required to attend 90 percent of classes. Moreover, for classes one to five, students must obtain A1 marks in aggregate. For classes six to 10, they have to achieve an A1 grade in all subjects. For classes 11 to 12, students have to achieve a minimum of 85 percent marks in aggregate. Students must showcase exemplary behavior. The school offers a scholarship fund (Shiksha Fund).

House structure

JPIS follows a house structure, in which each house is run by a housemaster. The housemaster is an active member of the teaching staff and is aided by a house captain who belongs to the senior school. One senior student serves as school captain and is helped by prefects. The students are assigned to a house and loyalty to the house is cultivated.

References

School Information 
Award & Scholarship 
Faculty 
Laboratories 
Library

External links
Official website

High schools and secondary schools in Uttar Pradesh
Educational institutions established in 2004
Primary schools in Uttar Pradesh
Schools in Noida
2004 establishments in Uttar Pradesh